Staudinger–Grumke House–Store is a historic home and store located at Augusta, St. Charles County, Missouri. The house was built about 1859 by August Staudinger, and was later purchased by George Grumke in 1873, who used the structure to operate a saloon on the ground floor. The property was in the Grumke family until 1932.

The home is a -story, five bay, brick I-house.  The store occupied the first floor with living quarters above.  It measures approximately 46 feet wide by 43 feet deep and has a one-story frame addition built about 1880.

It was added to the National Register of Historic Places in 1992.  It is located in the Walnut Street Historic District.

References

Individually listed contributing properties to historic districts on the National Register in Missouri
Houses on the National Register of Historic Places in Missouri
Houses completed in 1859
Buildings and structures in St. Charles County, Missouri
National Register of Historic Places in St. Charles County, Missouri